Odd Man Out is a British sitcom starring John Inman that aired for seven episodes on ITV from 27 October to 8 December 1977. It was made by Thames Television and written by Vince Powell.

Synopsis
Neville Sutcliffe (John Inman), the owner of a Blackpool fish-and-chip shop, inherits his father's rock factory in Littlehampton. The series revolves around his adventures, which include learning to drive a car, going to Paris and swimming The Channel.

Characters
 Neville Sutcliffe (John Inman), the camp, simpering, illegitimate son of Herbert Sutcliffe, who left Neville and his half-sister Dorothy half of his factory and house. He sells his Blackpool fish-and-chip shop to his friend Bobby so that he and Dorothy can pay the bank the £30,000 that their father owed.
 Dorothy Sutcliffe (Josephine Tewson), the flustering, legitimate daughter of Herbert Sutcliffe and his wife. She doesn't take to Neville immediately, but later sees through the exterior and accepts him into the family.
 Ma (Avril Angers), the sweet, simple-natured Ma has worked for Herbert for many years. She is distinguished by her white turban and hair curler. It is thought that she and Herbert had an affair.
 Wilf (Peter Butterworth), the quiet, friendly man in charge at Littlehampton Rock Factory. He had worked there for almost twenty years when Herbert died, and is now the rock-puller. He lodges with Dorothy and Neville.
 Marilyn (Vivienne Johnson), the sex-obsessed Marilyn spends her time at Littlehampton using her knees to bend candy bananas. She speaks with a distinct Western accent. She is very flirtatious, especially towards Neville, whom she calls 'Mr. Neville'. Johnson played the role of young mister Grace's nurse in Are You Being Served?.
 Cleo (Glenna Forster-Jones), the only black member of the staff, is not from Jamaica, Trinidad or Barbados, but from Cockfosters, much to Neville's surprise. She is against people who judge others by their colour. Cleo is a kind person with a sense of humour.
 Percy (Jan Harding), the simple, quiet member of Littlehampton Rock Works. He pours the rock out into the pit where it is made.
 Auntie Cissie (Betty Alberge), Bobby's aunt, who helps him in the chip shop. She keeps wandering off and hanging up while on the telephone.

Episode list

DVD release
The complete series of Odd Man Out was released by Network in the UK (DVD Region 2) on 4 February 2013.

References

External links

1977 British television series debuts
1977 British television series endings
1970s British sitcoms
ITV sitcoms
Television series by Fremantle (company)
Television shows produced by Thames Television
English-language television shows
Television shows set in the United Kingdom
Television shows shot at Teddington Studios